Jurab may refer to:
 Jurab, Alborz
 Jurab, Ardabil
 Jurab, Hamadan